Kudymkar (Kudymkör; Komi-Permyak: Кудымкар, Kudymkar), is a town and the administrative center of Komi-Permyak Okrug of Perm Krai, Russia. Until 2005, it was the administrative center of Komi-Permyak Autonomous Okrug, a federal subject of Russia. It is located on the Inva River and on the left bank of its tributary the Kuva;  from Perm by road. Population:

History
It was first mentioned in 1579. In 1931, it was granted urban-type settlement status. In 1938, town status was granted.

Administrative and municipal status
Within the framework of administrative divisions, Kudymkar serves as the administrative center of Komi-Permyak Okrug, an administrative unit with special status within Perm Krai, and of Kudymkarsky District, even though it is not a part of it. As an administrative division, it is incorporated separately as the town of krai significance of Kudymkar—an administrative unit with the status equal to that of the districts. As a municipal division, the town of krai significance of Kudymkar is incorporated as Kudymkar Urban Okrug.

Economy
Most important companies are OAO "Moloko" (dairy products) and OAO "Myasokombinat" (meat products). There are also some other food industry companies.

Demographics
As of the 2002 Census, 64% of population were Komi-Permyak people; 33% were Russians.

Historical population of Kudymkar:
1959: 21,800
1970: 26,400
1979: 28,400
1989: 33,451
2002: 31,914
2010: 28,967

Notable residents 

Pyotr Subbotin-Permyak (1886–1923), avant-garde painter, professor of decorative painting

References

Notes

Sources

Cities and towns in Perm Krai
Komi-Permyak Okrug
Solikamsky Uyezd
Populated places established in 1579